Elsa Masriera Campillo (August 16, 1912, Chile - December 28, 2009, Buenos Aires, Argentina), better known as Elsa del Campillo, was a Chilean actress who made her acting career in Argentina.

Filmography

External links

1912 births
2009 deaths
Chilean film actresses
Chilean stage actresses
Chilean television actresses
Chilean emigrants to Argentina